The elm cultivar Ulmus 'Lombartsii' is considered "possibly Ulmus × hollandica or Ulmus carpinifolia (: minor)" by Green (1964). The tree was raised by Lombarts Nurseries at Zundert, Netherlands, circa 1910.

Description
The tree was first described by Lombarts in the 1921–22 catalogue, p.  25, as U. suberosa pendula Lombartsi: "a graceful tree with pendulous branches covered in corky wings. The wings become less prominent with age". Leaves are small with sharp pointed serratures on the margin, lamina of leaf is unequal at the base and quite long acuminated at the apex.

Pests and diseases
The tree is not known to have a resistance to Dutch elm disease.

Cultivation
With no known resistance to Dutch elm disease, the tree is now very rare in Europe. 'Lombartsii' is not known to have been introduced to North America or Australasia.

Accessions
Europe
Grange Farm Arboretum, Lincolnshire, UK. Acc. no. 1133, as U. minor 'Lombartsii.

Nurseries
Centrum voor Botanische Verrijking vzw, Kampenhout, Belgium, (as Ulmus minor 'Lombartsii').

Synonymy
Ulmus procera propendens Lombarts: Cat. 1955–56, p. 85. 
Ulmus suberosa pendula Lombartii: Floralia, 41 (39): 615, 1920.

References

External links
  Formerly labelled U. carpinifolia var. subpendula 'Lombartsii' (Wageningen Arboretum specimen, 1962, with samarae)
  Formerly labelled U. carpinifolia var. subpendula 'Lombartsii' (Wageningen Arboretum specimen, 1962)
  Formerly labelled U. foliacea Gilib. 'Lombartsii' (Wageningen Arboretum specimen, 1962)
  Formerly labelled U. foliacea Gilib. 'Lombartsii' (Wageningen Arboretum specimen, 1962, with samarae)
  Formerly labelled U. foliacea Gilib. 'Lombartsii' (Wageningen Arboretum specimen, 1962; long shoot)
  Labelled Ulmus lombardsii fol. var. 

Elm cultivars
Zundert
Ulmus articles missing images
Ulmus